Båtsfjorden or Båtsfjord is a fjord in Båtsfjord Municipality in Troms og Finnmark county, Norway. The village of Båtsfjord is located at the innermost end of the fjord.

References

Fjords of Troms og Finnmark
Båtsfjord